This is a list of school districts in Cook County, Illinois.

This list includes school districts with any amount of territory within Cook County, even if the districts do not operate any schools nor have their administration buildings in Cook County. The list of districts includes:

K-12
 Barrington Community Unit School District 220
 Community Unit School District 300
 Chicago Public School District 299
 Elmwood Park Community Unit School District 401
 School District U-46

Secondary
 Argo Community High School District 217
 Bloom Township High School District 206
 Bremen Community High School District 228
 Community High School District 218
 Consolidated High School District 230
 Evanston Township High School District 202
 Evergreen Park Community High School District 231
 Hinsdale Township High School District 86
 Homewood-Flossmoor Community High School District 233
 Lemont Township High School District 210
 Leyden Community High School District 212
 Lyons Township High School District 204
 Maine Township High School District 207
 J. Sterling Morton High School District 201
 New Trier Township High School District 203
 Niles Township Community High School District 219
 Northfield Township High School District 225
 Oak Lawn Community High School District 229
 Oak Park and River Forest District 200
 Proviso Township High School District 209
 Reavis Township High School District 220
 Rich Township High School District 227
 Ridgewood Community High School District 234
 Riverside Brookfield Township School District 208
 Thornton Fractional Township High School District 215
 Thornton Township High School District 205
 Township High School District 211
 Township High School District 214

Elementary
 Alsip-Hazelgreen-Oaklawn School District 126
 Arbor Park School District 145
 Arlington Heights School District 25
 Atwood Heights School District 125
 Avoca School District 37
 Bellwood School District 88
 Berkeley School District 87
 Berwyn North School District 98
 Berwyn South School District 100
 Brookfield School District 95
 Brookwood School District 167
 Burbank School District 111
 Burnham School District 154-5
 Calumet City School District 155
 Calumet Public School District 132
 Central Stickney School District 110
 Chicago Heights School District 170
 Chicago Ridge School District 127-5
 Cicero School District 99
 Community Consolidated School District 59
 Community Consolidated School District 146
 Community Consolidated School District 168
 Cook County School District 130
 Country Club Hills School District 160
 Des Plaines Community Consolidated School District 62
 Dolton School District 149
 Dolton School District 148
 East Maine School District 63
 East Prairie School District 73
 Elementary School District 159
 Evanston Community Consolidated School District 65
 Evergreen Park Elementary School District 124
 Flossmoor School District 161
 Ford Heights School District 169
 Forest Park School District 91
 Forest Ridge School District 142
 Franklin Park School District 84
 Glencoe School District 35
 Glenview Community Consolidated School District 34
 Golf Elementary School District 67
 Harvey School District 152
 Hazel Crest School District 152-5
 Hillside School District 93
 Hinsdale Community Consolidated School District 181
 Homewood School District 153
 Hoover-Schrum Memorial School District 157
 Indian Springs School District 109
 Kenilworth School District 38
 Kirby School District 140
 Komarek School District 94
 LaGrange School District 102
 LaGrange School District 105
 LaGrange Highlands School District 106
 Lansing School District 158
 Lemont-Bromberek Combined School District 113A
 Lincoln Elementary School District 156
 Lincolnwood School District 74
 Lindop School District 92
 Lyons School District 103
 Mannheim School District 83
 Northbrook/Glenview School District 30
 Matteson Elementary School District 162
 Maywood-Melrose Park-Broadview School District 89
 Midlothian School District 143
 Morton Grove School District 70
 Mount Prospect School District 57
 Niles Elementary School District 71
 Norridge School District 80
 North Palos School District 117
 Northbrook Elementary School District 27
 Northbrook School District 28
 Oak Lawn-Hometown School District 123
 Oak Park Elementary School District 97
 Orland School District 135
 Palatine Community Consolidated School District 15
 Palos Heights School District 128
 Palos Community Consolidated School District 118
 Park Forest School District 163
 Park Ridge Consolidated Community School District 64
 General George Patton School District 133
 Pennoyer School District 79
 Pleasantdale School District 107
 Posen-Robbins Elementary School District 143-5
 Prairie-Hills Elementary School District 144
 Prospect Heights School District 23
 Rhodes School District 84-5
 Ridgeland School District 122
 River Forest School District 90
 River Grove School District 85-5
 River Trails School District 26
 Riverside School District 96
 Rosemont Elementary School District 78
 Sandridge School District 172
 Schaumburg Community Consolidated School District 54
 Schiller Park School District 81
 Skokie School District 68
 Skokie School District 69
 Skokie School District 73-5
 Skokie-Fairview School District 72
 South Holland School District 150
 South Holland School District 151
 Steger School District 194
 Summit School District 104
 Sunnybrook School District 171
 Sunset Ridge School District 29
 Thornton School District 154
 Union Ridge School District 86
 West Harvey-Dixmoor Public School District 147
 West Northfield School District 31
 Westchester School District 92-5
 Western Springs School District 101
 Wheeling Community Consolidated School District 21
 Willow Springs School District 108
 Wilmette School District 39
 Winnetka School District 36
 Worth School District 127

Defunct
Lemont Community Consolidated School District 113 — consolidated with Bromberek School District 65 to form Lemont-Bromberek Combined School District 113A in 1990

See also
 List of school districts in Illinois

References

Notes

School districts in Cook County, Illinois